The  Drakensberg Pumped Storage Scheme is an energy storage facility built in the South African provinces of Free State and KwaZulu-Natal starting in 1974 and completed by 1981.

Four dams are involved in the scheme; the Driekloof Dam (joined to the Sterkfontein Dam), the Kilburn Dam, the Woodstock Dam and the Driel Barrage. Electricity generation equipment is located between Driekloof Dam and Kilburn Dam. Since the Driekloof Dam/Sterkfontein Dam also forms part of the Tugela-Vaal Water Project some of the water pumped to Driekloof Dam might end up flowing to the Vaal Dam and not be available for return to the Kilburn Dam. The Woodstock Dam and Driel Barrage are used to supply this additional water to Kilburn Dam when required.

The water is pumped to Driekloof during times of low national power consumption (generally over weekends) and released back into Kilburn through four  turbine generators in times of high electricity demand.

See also 

 Pumped-storage hydroelectricity
 List of power stations in South Africa
 List of energy storage projects

References

External links 
 Drakensberg Pumped Storage Scheme on the Eskom-Website

Energy infrastructure completed in 1981
Pumped-storage hydroelectric power stations in South Africa
Tugela River
Vaal River
Water supply infrastructure in South Africa
Economy of the Free State (province)
Economy of KwaZulu-Natal
1981 establishments in South Africa
20th-century architecture in South Africa